"Hang Tough" is a 1989 song by the band Tesla, from their album, The Great Radio Controversy.

Hang Tough may also refer to:

"Hang Tough", a song by the band Fluke on the 2003 album Puppy
Hang Tough, an event on the 1995 Australian series Gladiators

See also
 Hangin' Tough, a 1988 New Kids on the Block album
 "Hangin' Tough" (song), a song from the album
 Hangin' Tough (Waylon Jennings album), 1987